Édouard Petre (16 April 1895 – 1 November 1936) was a French racing cyclist. He rode in the 1924 Tour de France.

References

1895 births
1936 deaths
French male cyclists
Place of birth missing